The men's javelin throw competition of the athletics events at the 2019 Pan American Games took place on the 10 of August at the 2019 Pan American Games Athletics Stadium. The defending Pan American Games champion is Keshorn Walcott from Trinidad and Tobago.

Anderson Peters won Grenada's first ever Pan American Games gold medal.

Records
Prior to this competition, the existing world and Pan American Games records were as follows:

Schedule

Results
All times shown are in meters.

Final
The results were as follows:

References

Athletics at the 2019 Pan American Games
2019